Butler College Prep (formerly known as Pullman College Prep) is a public four-year charter high school located in the Pullman neighborhood of Chicago, Illinois, USA. It is a part of the Noble Network of Charter Schools. It shares its campus with Corliss High School.  It is named after John and Alice Butler, who provided the funding necessary to open the school. It is a part of the Noble Network of Charter Schools. Butler College Prep is a Level 1 school, based on CPS school quality rankings. Butler College Prep opened in 2013.

Enrichment and After-School Programming 
Butler offers a variety of programs and athletics outside of the school day and during the summer. Butler College Prep is a member of the Noble League athletic conference. Leaders receive enrichment credit during the school year through playing sports and participating in on-campus enrichment opportunities such as the Debate Team, Student Government, Marching/Pep Band, Step Team, Yearbook, and Yoga. Butler College Prep students have the option of participating in the Summer of a Lifetime program, where they are provided funding and support to participate in life-changing, summer academic enrichment programs on college campuses nationwide.

Awards, Accolades, and Recognition 
In 2016, Butler College Prep was recognized by Chicago Magazine as the best charter high school in Chicago.  The previous year, In 2015, the Illinois Network of Charter Schools recognized Butler College Prep as the state’s highest-performing charter school (in terms of test growth) with a predominantly black student body.  Butler College Prep has also been recognized by Ebony Magazine for its commitment to diversity in itsteaching staff. In 2016, Fusion Media Group spotlighted a teacher and a student with cerebral palsy from Butler College Prep.

References

External links
Noble Network of Charter Schools

Educational institutions established in 2013
Noble Network of Charter Schools
Public high schools in Chicago
2013 establishments in Illinois